Destry Rides Again is an album by American jazz pianist Randy Weston recorded in 1959 featuring music from the comedy stage musical Destry Rides Again and originally released on the United Artists label.

Reception

Allmusic awarded the album 3 stars.

Track listing 
All compositions by Harold Rome
 "We’re Ladies - 1:53
 "I Know Your Kind" - 2:29
 "Rose Lovejoy of Paradise Alley"- 2:29
 "Anyone Would Love You"- 3:04
 "Once Knew a Fella" - 2:15
 "Every Once in a While" - 2:13
 "Fair Warning" - 2:50
 "Are You Ready Gyp Watson?" - 1:46
 "That Ring on the Finger" - 2:08
 "Once Knew a Fella (Reprise)" - 2:39
 "I Say Hello" - 2:50

Personnel 
Randy Weston - piano
Slide Hampton, Bennie Green, Melba Liston, Frank Rehak - trombone
Peck Morrison - bass
Elvin Jones - drums
Willie Rodriguez - percussion

References 

Randy Weston albums
1959 albums
Albums arranged by Melba Liston
United Artists Records albums